Mercury sulfide,  or mercury(II) sulfide is a chemical compound composed of the chemical elements mercury and sulfur.  It is represented by the chemical formula HgS. It is virtually insoluble in water.

Crystal structure

HgS is dimorphic with two crystal forms:
 red cinnabar (α-HgS, trigonal, hP6, P3221) is the form in which mercury is most commonly found in nature. Cinnabar has rhombohedral crystal system. Crystals of red are optically active. This is caused by the Hg-S helices in the structure.
 black metacinnabar (β-HgS) is less common in nature and adopts the zinc blende (T2d-F3m) crystal structure.

Preparation and chemistry
β-HgS precipitates as a black solid when Hg(II) salts are treated with H2S.  The reaction is conveniently conducted with an acetic acid solution of mercuric acetate.  With gentle heating of the slurry, the black polymorph converts to the red form. β-HgS is unreactive to all but concentrated acids.

Mercury is produced from the cinnabar ore by roasting in air and condensing the vapour.
HgS → Hg + S

Uses

When α-HgS is used as a red pigment, it is known as vermilion. The tendency of vermilion to darken has been ascribed to conversion from red α-HgS to black β-HgS. However β-HgS was not detected at excavations in Pompeii, where originally red walls darkened, and was attributed to the formation of Hg-Cl compounds (e.g., corderoite, calomel, and terlinguaite) and calcium sulfate, gypsum.

As the mercury cell as used in the chlor-alkali industry (Castner–Kellner process) is being phased out over concerns over mercury emissions, the metallic mercury from these setups is converted into mercury sulfide for underground storage.

With the band gap of 2.1eV and its stability, it is possible to be used as photo-electrochemical cells

See also
 Mercury poisoning
 Mercury(I) sulfide (mercurous sulfide),

References

Sulfides
Mercury(II) compounds
Zincblende crystal structure